Gummagol is a village in Dharwad district of Karnataka, India.

Demographics 
As of the 2011 Census of India there were 563 households in Gummagol and a total population of 2,861 consisting of 1,483 males and 1,378 females. There were 373 children ages 0-6.

References

Villages in Dharwad district